Kendric Pryor (born January 6, 1998) is an American football wide receiver for the Jacksonville Jaguars of the National Football League (NFL). He played college football at Wisconsin.

College career
Pryor played college football at the University of Wisconsin–Madison from 2016 to 2021. During his career, he had 99 receptions for 1,265 yards and seven touchdowns.

Professional career

Cincinnati Bengals
Pryor signed with the Cincinnati Bengals as an undrafted free agent in 2022. He was waived by the team on August 30, 2022.

Jacksonville Jaguars
On August 31, 2022, Pryor was claimed off waivers by the Jacksonville Jaguars.

References

External links
Wisconsin Badgers bio
Jacksonville Jaguars bio

1998 births
Living people
People from Cook County, Illinois
American football wide receivers
Wisconsin Badgers football players
Cincinnati Bengals players
Jacksonville Jaguars players